Dapodi railway station (Station code: DAPD) is a railway station on Mumbai–Chennai line. It has two platforms and a foot over bridge. It serves the neighbourhood of Dapodi.

Long-distance trains 

Only a few long-distance trains have stops at this station. They are,
Mumbai–Sainagar Shirdi Fast Passenger.
Mumbai–Bijapur Fast Passenger.
Mumbai–Pandharpur Fast Passenger.
Pune–Karjat Passenger.

Suburban railway

 Pune Junction–Lonavla trains.
 Pune Junction–Talegaon trains.
 Shivajinagar–Lonavla trains.
 Shivajinagar–Talegaon trains.

References

Pune Suburban Railway
Pune railway division
Railway stations in Pune district